Professor X is a Marvel Comics superhero.

Professor X may also refer to:

Professor X the Overseer, hip hop activist, leader of the Blackwatch Movement, and member of the group X-Clan, born Lumumba Carson
Arabian Prince, rapper and hip hop producer, also known as Professor X
Professor X, a 1940s Captain Flight Comics comic-book character
Professor X, pseudonymous author of In the Basement of the Ivory Tower